Dragan Miletović (born November 24, 1956) is a former Serbian football player.

External links

Dragans picture
Na danasnji dan

1956 births
Living people
Sportspeople from Mitrovica, Kosovo
Serbian footballers
Yugoslav footballers
Association football defenders
Yugoslav First League players
FK Trepča players
Red Star Belgrade footballers
FK Sutjeska Nikšić players
Yugoslav expatriate footballers
Expatriate footballers in Sweden
Yugoslav expatriate sportspeople in Sweden